Nahirianka is a village or rural settlements located in the Chortkiv Raion (district) of the Ternopil Oblast (province of Western Ukraine). It hosts the administration of Nahirianka rural hromada, one of the hromadas of Ukraine. The area of the village totals is 14,80 km2 and the population of the village is about 2122 people. Local government is administered by Nahirianska village council.

Geography 
The village is located on the banks of the Cherkaska River (right tributary of Seret River , Dniester River basin).

History and Attractions 
The village is known from the 16th century, although the official founding date of village is 1785. Initially the village it was known as the suburbs of the village Yahilnytsya. But archeological sights and remains of settlements of Trypillian culture (3rd millennium BC) and Culture of ancient Rus (11th-13th centuries) it was found near the village Nahirianka.
Nahiryanka village contains one of the most powerful castles hetman S. Lyantskoronsky – Yagelnitsky Castle, 1630. There are an architectural monuments of local importance of the Ternopil region, Chortkiv district in the village. It is a wooden Church of St. Michael 1672–1782 years (N-691/1) and wooden bell tower 18th century (N-481/2).

References

External links 
 weather.in.ua/Nahirianka (Ternopil region)
 Village Yahilnytsya Nahirianka
 Yagelnitsky Castle, Nahirianka, cultural objects – Pointerst
 Замок Лянцкоронських (с.Ягільниця, Тернопільська обл.): карта, опис 
 Церква св.Миколая (Селище Нагірянка, Тернопільська обл.): карта, опис  
  Нагірянка - Замки і храми України 

Villages in Chortkiv Raion